Virago is a British publisher of women's writing and books on feminist topics. Started and run by women in the 1970s and bolstered by the success of the Women's Liberation Movement (WLM), Virago has been credited as one of several British feminist presses that helped address inequitable gender dynamics in publishing. Unlike alternative, anti-capitalist publishing projects and zines coming out of feminist collectives and socialist circles, Virago branded itself as a commercial alternative to the male-dominated publishing industry and sought to compete with mainstream international presses.

History 
Virago was founded in 1973 by Carmen Callil, primarily to publish books by women writers. It was originally known as Spare Rib Books, sharing a name with the most famous magazine of the British women's liberation movement or second-wave feminism. (The first issue of Spare Rib  magazine, whose founders included Rosie Boycott and Marsha Rowe, was published in June 1972.) From the start, Virago published two sorts of books: original works, and out-of-print books by neglected female writers. The latter were reissued under the "Modern Classics" insignia, which launched in 1978 with Frost in May, a novel by the British author Antonia White originally published in 1933. The Virago list also contains works with feminist themes by male authors, such as H. G. Wells. Valentine Cunningham has praised Virago for trawling "most impressively and fruitfully in the novel catalogues" of the 1930s for women's fiction to reprint.

In 1982, Virago became a wholly owned subsidiary of the Chatto, Virago, Bodley Head, and Cape Group (CVBC), but in 1987 Callil, Lennie Goodings, Ursula Owen, Alexandra Pringle, and Harriet Spicer put together a management buy-out from CVBC, then owned by Random House, USA. The buy-out was financed by Rothschild Ventures and Robert Gavron. Random House UK kept a ten per cent stake in the company, and continued to handle sales and distribution. In 1993 Rothschild Ventures sold their shares to the directors and Gavron, who thus became the largest single shareholder.  

After a downturn in the market forced a reduction in activity, the board decided to sell the company to Little, Brown, of which Virago became an imprint in 1996 (with Lennie Goodings as Publisher and Sally Abbey as Senior Editor). The sale to Little Brown, a large company owned by the telecommunications giant Time Warner, was met with negative publicity and raised questions about the future of feminist publishing houses. In 2006, Virago's parent company became part of publishing group Hachette Livre. Lennie Goodings remains as editor and publisher.

Legacy 
In 2008 the British Library acquired the Virago Press Archive consisting of organisational papers, author/editor files, publicity materials and photographs.

Virago was the subject of an hour-long BBC Four television documentary, Virago: Changing the World One Page at a Time, that was first broadcast in October 2016.

Notable authors
 Maya Angelou
 Margaret Atwood
 Beatrix Campbell
 Angela Carter
 Barbara Comyns
Daphne du Maurier
 Eva Figes
Zora Neale Hurston
 Kate Millett
 Juliet Mitchell
 Adrienne Rich
 Sheila Rowbotham
 Lynne Segal
 Elaine Showalter
 Melanie Silgardo (also editor)
 Carolyn Steedman 
 Barbara Taylor
Sylvia Townsend Warner
 Antonia White
 Naomi Wolf

Notes

Further reading
  Google preview.

External links
Virago website
List of Virago modern classics
Virago Press Archive at the British Library

1973 establishments in the United Kingdom
Book publishing companies of the United Kingdom
Feminist mass media
Publishing companies established in 1973